Bernardo Clesio (1 March 1484 – 30 July 1539) was an Italian Cardinal, bishop, diplomat, humanist and botanist.

Born in Cles, in the Prince-Bishopric of Trent, today Trentino, he graduated from the University of Bologna. He later became Prince-Bishop of Trent (1514–1539) and of Brixen (1539), cardinal, and chancellor of Holy Roman Emperor Ferdinand I.

He was a key contributor to the organization of the Council of Trent and greatly embellished and expanded Trento in the process. He commissioned the rebuilding of the Church of Santa Maria Maggiore, Trento, enlarged the Castello del Buonconsiglio and called upon Renaissance artists such as Dosso Dossi and Romanino to decorated the additions.

References

External links

1485 births
1539 deaths
People from Cles
Prince-Bishops of Trent
Bishops of Brixen
16th-century Italian cardinals
Participants in the Council of Trent
Italian Renaissance humanists
16th-century Roman Catholic bishops in the Holy Roman Empire